Inal Arsenovich Getigezhev (born 23 May 1987) is a Russian former professional footballer. In 2018 he played for Torpedo-BelAZ Zhodino.

Club career
He made his debut in the Russian Premier League in 2006 for FC Lokomotiv Moscow.

Honours
 Russian Premier League bronze: 2006

References

External links

1987 births
Sportspeople from Rostov-on-Don
Living people
Russian footballers
Association football defenders
Russia national football B team footballers
Russian Premier League players
Russian expatriate footballers
Expatriate footballers in Belarus
FC Lokomotiv Moscow players
FC Rostov players
FC Torpedo Moscow players
FC Volga Nizhny Novgorod players
FC Nizhny Novgorod (2007) players
FC Rubin Kazan players
FC Orenburg players
FC Torpedo-BelAZ Zhodino players